INS Vagir (S41) was a  diesel-electric submarine of the Indian Navy.

Vagir was named after a species of sandfish.

References

Foxtrot-class submarines
Ships built in the Soviet Union
1972 ships
Vela-class submarines